Cross-country skiing at the 2014 Winter Olympics was held at the Laura Biathlon & Ski Complex near Krasnaya Polyana, Russia. The twelve events took place between 8–23 February 2014.

Competition schedule

The following is the competition schedule for all twelve events.

All times are (UTC+4).

Medal summary

Medal table

Men's events

  In November 2017, Alexander Legkov and Maxim Vylegzhanin of Russia were disqualified by IOC and stripped of their gold and silver medal, but Court of Arbitration for Sport nullified the disqualifications and returned the medals to the Russian athletes on February 1, 2018.
  In November 2017, Alexander Legkov and Maxim Vylegzhanin of Russia were disqualified by IOC and the Russian  was stripped of its silver medal, but Court of Arbitration for Sport nullified the disqualifications and returned the medal to the Russian  on February 1, 2018.
  In November 2017, Maxim Vylegzhanin of Russia was disqualified by IOC and the Russian  was stripped of its silver medal, but Court of Arbitration for Sport nullified the disqualification and returned the medal to the Russian  on February 1, 2018.

Women's events

Qualification

A maximum of 310 quota spots were available to athletes to compete at the games. A maximum of 20 athletes could be entered by a National Olympic Committee, with a maximum of 12 men or 12 women. There were two qualification standards for the games: an A standard and a B standard.

Participating nations
310 athletes from 54 nations participated, with number of athletes in parentheses. Chile made its Olympic debut in the sport. Dominica, qualified for the Winter Olympics for the first time, and its two athletes competed in cross-country skiing. India's athlete was planned to compete as an Independent Olympic Participants, as the Indian Olympic Association was suspended by the International Olympic Committee, but the suspension had since been lifted.

References

External links
 Official Results Book – Cross-Country Skiing
 

 
2014 Winter Olympics
2014 Winter Olympics events
Olympics
Cross-country skiing competitions in Russia